is an interchange railway station in the city Fuji, Shizuoka Prefecture, Japan operated by the Central Japan Railway Company (JR Tōkai).  It is also a terminus for the private railway operator Gakunan Electric Train Company and a freight terminal of the Japan Freight Railway Company.

Lines
It is the terminus of the Gakunan Railway Line.

Layout
JR Yoshiwara Station has a single island platform serving Track 1 and Track 2, which are on passing loops On the outside of either track are tracks to permit the through transit of express trains. The platform is connected to the station building by a footbridge. The station is attended and has a Midori no Madoguchi staffed ticket office. The Gakunan Electric Railway portion of the station has a bay platform with two tracks, only one of which is in normal daily use.

Platforms

Adjacent stations

|-
!colspan=5|Central Japan Railway Company

|-
!colspan=5|Gakunan Electric Train

History
It became a terminus for the Gakunan Railway on November 18, 1949 and was renamed Yoshiwara Station (after Yoshiwara-juku on the old Tōkaidō on April 10, 1956. The present station building dates from 1970. Container freight services began operations from 1994.

Station numbering was introduced to the section of the Tōkaidō Line operated JR Central in March 2018; Yoshiwara Station was assigned station number CA07.

Passenger statistics
In fiscal 2017, the JR station was used by an average of 3358 passengers daily and the Gakunan station was used by an average of 2016 passengers daily (boarding passengers only).

Surrounding area
Japan National Route 1
Tagonoura Port

See also
 List of Railway Stations in Japan

References

Yoshikawa, Fumio. Tokaido-sen 130-nen no ayumi. Grand-Prix Publishing (2002) .

External links

JR Central Station Information 

Railway stations in Shizuoka Prefecture
Tōkaidō Main Line
Railway stations in Japan opened in 1889
Stations of Central Japan Railway Company
Stations of Japan Freight Railway Company
Fuji, Shizuoka